Sproat may refer to:

Alexander Sproat (1834–1890), Ontario land surveyor, businessman and political figure
Clyde Sproat (1930–2008), Hawaiian falsetto musician
Ebenezer Sproat (1752–1805), colonel in the Continental Army during the American Revolutionary War, and a pioneer to the Ohio Country
Gilbert Malcolm Sproat (1834–1913), Scottish-born Canadian businessman, office holder, and author
Hugh Sproat (born 1952), Scottish footballer who played as a goalkeeper
Iain Sproat (born 1938), retired British Conservative politician and former Member of Parliament
Ron Sproat (1932–2009), screenwriter and playwright known for his work on Dark Shadows

See also
Sproat Lake, lake in central Vancouver Island
Sproat Lake Provincial Park, lake in central Vancouver Island